Prolimacodes badia, the skiff moth, is a moth of the family Limacodidae. It is found in North America from New Hampshire to Florida, west to southern Ontario, Missouri, Arkansas and Mississippi.

The wingspan is 24–35 mm. Adults are on wing from May to September.

The larvae feed on the leaves of a wide variety of trees and shrubs, including birch, blueberry, cherry, chestnut, Ostrya virginiana, oak, poplar, Myrica gale and willow.

External links
Bug Guide

Limacodidae
Taxa named by Jacob Hübner
Moths of North America